Visit Turks and Caicos Islands is a tourism organization tasked with promoting tourism in the Turks and Caicos Islands. Tourism is the main driver of the national economy in the Turks and Caicos Islands, accounting for 42.8% of the national GDP in 2013.

Signage

Visit Turks and Caicos Islands, through a partnership with local businesses, has constructed conservation signage at beaches in the Turks and Caicos, highlighting dangers and guidelines for protecting the natural eco-system.

See also
 Tourism in the Turks and Caicos Islands

References

External links
 Visit Turks and Caicos Islands

Tourism in the Turks and Caicos Islands
Tourism agencies